Lani Bayot Misalucha (born Lani Dimalanta Bayot; August 3, 1969) is a Filipino singer who performs pop, rock, jazz, soul, rhythm and blues, and operatic arias. Her ability to sing across several genres gave her the title "Asia's Nightingale" by MTV Southeast Asia. She was also nominated for an Aliw Award for playing Sita in the 1999 Filipino musical Rama at Sita - The Musical.

Since arriving in Las Vegas in 2002, Misalucha has been called "New Siren of the Strip." During her stint in Las Vegas, Misalucha performed with the Society of Seven at Bally's Las Vegas and the Flamingo Las Vegas, making her the first Asian to headline in a main showroom at the Las Vegas Strip. She also performed alongside Earl Turner at the Westgate Las Vegas Resort & Casino. In March 2008, she was voted the "Best Singer" (staff pick) in the "27th Annual Best of Las Vegas" poll by the Las Vegas Review-Journal. In 2009, Las Vegas Mayor Oscar Goodman proclaimed December 4 as "Lani Misalucha Day" in the city. In 2014, Misalucha returned to the Philippines and signed a recording contract with Star Records, releasing an album entitled The Nightingale Returns.

Biography
Lani Misalucha was born into a musical family. Her father Benjamin de Guzmán Bayot was an operatic tenor, while her mother Esperanza Salvador Dimalanta was a coloratura soprano. Her sister May is a band vocalist; another sister, Karlyn, is an actress (Munting Paraiso) who also plays the violin and flute, while their brothers Novi and Osi play the guitar and piano. She was tutored in classical vocals by her parents.

Misalucha acquired her basic education from Rafael Palma Elementary School and PCU Union High School. At age 20, she sang with the Andres Bonifacio Choir of the Cultural Center of the Philippines. She eventually joined various bands as a vocalist or back-up singer, beginning with the group "Prelude" and later the group "Law of Gravity" whose bandleader Bodjie Dasig gave Misalucha her first single, entitled "More than I Should" (1993). She also recorded Dasig’s ballad "Sakayan ng Jeep”. Misalucha later worked  the lounge circuits as a soloist and lent her voice to numerous commercial jingles and karaoke tapes, thus earning her the epithet, "Multiplex Queen."

After Misalucha obtained her degree in Business Management from the Philippine Christian University, she married Noli Misalucha and later gave birth to two children, Lian and Louven.

Misalucha is a member of a group for the benefit of Hurricane Katrina victims in New Orleans. She is also a member of the Church of Jesus Christ of Latter-day Saints.

Health 
In an interview with GMA Network on January 5, 2008, Misalucha stated that she was set to undergo surgery on an ovarian cyst (2.5 cm. now enlarged to 7.1 cm.) by February 2008.

In October 2020, Misalucha and her husband contracted and later recovered from bacterial meningitis. However, they both became completely deaf in their right ears.

Career 
Misalucha sang the song "Ang Iibigin ay Ikaw" (written by Jimmy Borja) which was a finalist at the Metro Manila Popular Music Festival and later received the Awit Award for Record of the Year. She recorded an album "More than I Should" (Alpha Records) with carrier single of the same title written by Odette Quesada in 1990. The album included Misalucha's cover of Fifth Dimension's "Somebody Warm Like Me" . The entire album earned 12 Katha Award nominations in 1997.

In 1998, Misalucha won the Minuro Endo Best Interpreter/Singer Award at the 3rd Asian Song Festival. Her piece entitled "Handle with Care" (written by Gideon Jungee Marcelo) won silver in the Best Original Song category.

In 1998, Misalucha moved to Viva Records and her album, with carrier single "Tunay na Mahal" (written by Freddie Saturno), made the charts and turned gold, later receiving the Awit Award for Best Ballad Recording, Awit Award for Best Performance by a Female Recording Artist, and Katha Award for Best Female Pop Vocal Performance. Her cover of the 1966 song, "You Don't Have To Say You Love Me" topped the Philippine charts in the same year.

Misalucha's interpretation of "Can't Stop Loving You" (written by Dodjie Simon) won her songwriter the Grand Prize at the 1999 Metropop Song Festival. She was tapped to play the lead role of Sita in the S.K. Productions musical play entitled Rama at Sita. In 1999, Misalucha also received Artist of the Year Award, Aliw Award for Best Lounge Act, Awit Award for Best Performance by a Female Recording Artist, and Awit Award Nomination for Best Stage Actress.

In 2000, Misalucha released the album All Heart, a collection of love songs with the carrier single "One More Time" (written by Simon). The album also included songs written by some of the Philippines' contemporary composers such as Vehnee Saturno ("Ang Lahat Ng Ito Ay Para Sa Iyo"), Jimmy Borja ("Bukas Na Lang Kita Mamahalin") and Trina Belamide ("Save This Heart").

She became a semi-regular host in the Sunday noontime show SOP (Sobrang Okey Pare) in 2001. Her first major solo concert in September 2001 at the Araneta Coliseum entitled, "Lani Misalucha, The Crossover Live Tour" and was repeated at the Cultural Center of Philippines. These concerts received the Aliw Award for Best Major Concert by a Female Artist and the Tinig Award for Best Solo Performer. Her Crossover Live Concert album received the Platinum Award.

In 2002, Misalucha continued to hold concerts in Cebu City, Bacolod, Baguio, Clark (Angeles City), and Davao City, as well as at OnStage Greenbelt, Makati. Misalucha then held a US concert tour, performing in Reno, San Diego, Washington, Las Vegas, New York, Chicago, Atlantic City, Pasadena, Los Angeles and San Francisco. Mayor Willie L. Brown, Jr. of San Francisco declared August 17 "Lani Misalucha Day".

Misalucha received the Aliw Award for Best Female Performance in Music Lounges, Bars, Clubs & Restaurants for consecutive years, 1999–2002. In 2002, she received Aliw "Entertainer of the Year." In addition, she won two Katha awards—Best Folk Song Vocal Performance and Best Traditional Song Vocal Performance for "Kasal Sa Kaluluwa" (2002).

Misalucha released her fourth studio album entitled, Loving You in June 2003 with the singles "Tila" (written by Liza Diy) and "Malaya Ka Na" (written by Jimmy Antiporda). In November of the same year, she began a TV show entitled Celebrity Turns with actor-comedian Michael V.

In 2004, Misalucha subordinated budding career to family interest when her family relocated to the United States.

After the release of her fourth album, Loving You, Lani moved to the US and made history. Misalucha became the first Asian to headline in a Main Showroom of the Las Vegas Strip, performing with Hawaii's premiere showband Society of Seven at the Jubilee Theatre of Bally's Hotel and Casino. Her stint at Bally's ran for 15 months from August 7, 2004, to February 5, 2006, after which she and the Society of Seven moved to the Main Showroom of the Flamingo from August 2006 to April 13, 2008. Vegas critics were quick to recognize Lani, applauding and citing her as Las Vegas’ New Diva. With her successful 15-month run at the Bally's, a series of road tours, and subsequent offers to headline shows in the entertainment capital of the world, Asia's Nightingale sky-rocketed to world-wide recognition as the new Siren of the Strip.

By 2008, Vegas was more than glad to have the Siren of the Strip back on its premiere frontline. The Las Vegas Review Journal has just hailed Lani as Vegas' Best Singer (staff pick) on its 27th Annual Best of Vegas Poll, inevitably putting her name alongside Celine Dion, who was voted as reader's choice.  After capping off her stint at the Flamingo, Lani began another show, Voices, with Earl Turner at the Hilton in 2009.

Breaking ground on another stage yet again, Lani made history, in October 2011, when she debuted as lead host of the first mainstream travel and lifestyle television show featuring Las Vegas.  ‘It’s Vegas with Lani’ has for its first season, thirteen (13) 30-minute episodes that offer a new perspective of Sin City, featuring restaurants, shops, destinations and adventure tours for both local and global audiences. Lani's popularity in Vegas led City Mayor Oscar Goodman to declare December 4 as Lani Misalucha Day, following the footsteps of Mayor Willie L. Brown, Jr. who had also previously declared August 17 as Lani Misalucha Day for San Francisco.

Lani's artistry has truly come full circle. From her serendipitous debut to her recognition as an artist of international caliber, the story of Lani's journey with music transcends every song, heartfelt and genuine in its delivery of all the best that is yet to come.

At the height of her international success, Lani went back to the recording studio in October 2006, doing covers of well-loved classics for a self-titled album, her fifth release. Just as the album turned Gold and Platinum in 2007, Lani came home to regale her Filipino audience with songs and stories in a one-night engagement at the Araneta Coliseum on March 17, 2007. The concert, aptly titled, Missing You, was packed by almost 18,000 fans and followers, a testament not only to Lani's rousing world-class talent, but also to her dedication to the people who have come to love her music.

Misalucha re-appeared a few times on Philippine television starting on February 17, 2007, in the Sunday afternoon show "ASAP" of ABS-CBN (The Filipino Channel).

In the latter part of May 2007, record label Viva re-released "Lani Misalucha Live Vol. 1 and 2". The two-volume recording contains previously released material mostly from her Crossover Live Tour albums with various live performances from different albums within the Viva catalogue where she had appeared.

Misalucha was the voice behind the version of Gary Valenciano's "Natutulog Ba Ang Diyos?," theme song of the ABS-CBN television soap opera that goes by the same title.

At the 20th Awit Awards, her rendition of "I Live For Your Love" received Best Performance by a Female Recording Artist.

In November 2008, Universal Records released a Christmas CD titled The Gift of Christmas. The album comes with a Bonus CD featuring the Minus-One of the entire album.

Filmography

Television
 SOP (GMA Network, 2000–2006)
 ASAP (ABS-CBN, 2007–2016)
 5 Star Specials (TV5, 2010)
 P.O.5 (TV5, 2010)
 Talentadong Pinoy (TV5, 2010)
 Gandang Gabi, Vice! (ABS-CBN, 2012–2017) as Herself, Special Guest
 It's Showtime (ABS-CBN, 2013) as Herself, Special Guest 
 Banana Split (ABS-CBN, 2014) as Herself, Special Guest
 It's Showtime (ABS-CBN, 2014) as Herself, Guest Hurado
 Celebrity Bluff (GMA Network, 2016) as Herself, Special Guest
 I Love OPM (ABS-CBN, 2016) as Herself, Judge
 Sunday PinaSaya (GMA Network, 2016) as Herself, Guest Performer 
 Tunay na Buhay (GMA Network, 2016) as Herself, Special Guest
 Eat Bulaga! (GMA Network, 2017) as Herself, Guest Performer
 The Clash (GMA Network, 2018–present) as Herself, Judge
 Sunday PinaSaya (GMA Network, 2018) as Herself, Performer
 Sunday Noontime Live! (TV5, 2020) as Herself, Performer
 All-Out Sundays (GMA, 2020) as Herself, Performer

Discography

Studio albums
 More Than I Should (1997, Alpha)
 Tunay Na Mahal (True Love) (1998, Viva)
 All Heart (2000, Viva)
 Loving You (2003, Viva)
 Lani Misalucha (2006, Universal)
 Reminisce (2008, Universal)
 The Gift of Christmas (2008, Universal)
 The Nightingale Returns (2014, Star)

Live albums
 Love Concert - Vol. 1 and 2 (2001)
 Crossover Live Tour - Vol. 1 and 2 (2001)
 The Best of Crossover Presents (2003)
 Lani Misalucha Live Vol. 1 and 2 (2007, Viva)

Compilation albums
 Greatest Hits (2005)
 Silver Series (2006)
 18 Greatest Hits (2009)

Awards

See also 
Regine Velasquez
Jaya
Pops Fernandez
Zsa Zsa Padilla
Kuh Ledesma
Janno Gibbs
Ogie Alcasid
Martin Nievera
Sarah Geronimo
Gary Valenciano
Morissette

References

External links
 
 Lani Misalucha at Star Records

1969 births
Living people
Filipino women pop singers
Filipino Latter Day Saints
Singers with a three-octave vocal range
Filipino operatic sopranos
Universal Records (Philippines) artists
Philippine Christian University alumni
ABS-CBN personalities
GMA Network personalities
Star Music artists
Viva Artists Agency
Viva Records (Philippines) artists
Filipino musical theatre actresses
Tagalog people
Filipino television variety show hosts